Rain Chudori-Soerjoatmodjo (born 10 November 1994) is an Indonesian author, curator, multidisciplinary artist, and actress. Chudori has published several books.

Biography
Chudori is the daughter of writer Leila Chudori and curator Yudhi Soerjoatmodjo, and granddaughter of journalist Muhammad Chudori. Chudori lives in New Delhi and is currently an artist-in-residence in New York.

Chudori's short story collection Monsoon Tiger and Other Stories (2013) was launched in Jakarta in 2015. The book was translated into Indonesian under the title Biru dan Kisah-Kisah Lainnya in 2018. Her second book, a novel titled Imaginary City, was published in 2017.

Chudori is the founder of Moment Studio, a creative studio and curator of Comma Books, a division of Penerbit KPG (Kompas, Gramedia). She has received the National Book Committee's Translation Selection at the Frankfurt Book Fair in 2015, the LitRi Grant at the London Book Fair in 2018 and 2019, respectively. She has written for The Jakarta Post, The Jakarta Globe, Tempo, Salihara, VICE, Whiteboard Journal, Portside Review, The Letters Page, and Kill Your Darlings. She has appeared in Ubud Writers and Readers Festival, Singapore Writers Festival, Brahmaputra Literary Festival, among others. 

Chudori appeared in the film Rocket Rain, which was nominated at the Jogja-Netpac Film Festival and won the Geber Award. It was also nominated for Best Non-Cinema Feature Film and won Best Director at Apresiasi Film Indonesia. Chudori was nominated for Best New Actress by Piala Maya Indonesia. In 2017, she had a role in the film Galih dan Ratna.

Bibliography
 Monsoon Tiger and Other Stories (2015)
 Imaginary City (2018)
 Biru dan Kisah-Kisah Lainnya (2018)
 Imaginary City: A Visual Novel (2022)

Filmography
 Rocket Rain (2013)
 Galih dan Ratna (2017)

References

External links
 

1994 births
Living people
Indonesian women short story writers
Indonesian short story writers
Indonesian women writers
21st-century Indonesian writers
21st-century Indonesian women writers